Jaya Bharata Jananiya Tanujate, Jaya he Karnataka Maate(English: Victory to you Mother Karnataka, The Daughter of Mother India!) is a Kannada poem, which was composed by the Indian national poet Kuvempu. The poem was officially declared the state song of the Indian state of Karnataka on 6 January 2004.

The poem envisages a Karnataka that recognises its position in the comity of Indian states, believes in peaceful co-existence with her sisters, but at the same time maintains her self-respect and dignity from a position of confidence and strength rather than insecurity and fear.

Lyrics

Styles
The poem is set to tune by a number of Kannada composers, among which two tunes set by C. Ashwath and Mysore Ananthaswamy are the most popular ones. Recently there were some confusions and differences in opinion as to which tune should be used in rendition. The Prof. Shivarudrappa Committee, which was asked to suggest a befitting tune for the rendition of the song, had recommended that the music composed by Mysore Ananthaswamy was apt.

The Deputy Chief Minister of Karnataka, has asked Kannada University to create a uniform rendering for the song.

Controversy
 A controversy started in early 2004 demanding inducting Madhwacharya's name in Jaya Bharata Jananiya Tanujate, written by Kuvempu. Poornachandra Tejaswi, son of Kuvempu and holder of copyrights of Kuvempu's articles, strongly criticised any attempts to change the poem.

See also
 Flag of Karnataka
 List of Karnataka state symbols
 Jana Gana Mana
 Vande Mataram
 List of Indian state songs
 Karnataka

References

External links
Jaya Bharata Jananiya Tanujate

Indian poems
Indian state songs
Culture of Karnataka
Kannada-language songs